Noyeem Gahar (15 August 1937 – 7 October 2015) was a famous lyricist of Bangladesh. He was awarded the Independence Day Award in 2012 for his unique contribution in inspiring Mukti Bahini and the Bangladeshi people and forming public opinion through music during the Bangladesh Liberation war.

Early life 
Gahar was born on 15 August 1937 in Sepahipara village, Rampal union in Munshiganj Sadar Upazila, Munshiganj District.

Career 
During the Bangladesh Liberation war in 1971, his songs were used to boost the morale of Mukti Bahini soldiers. His songs included "Janma Amar Dhanya Holo Ma Go" and "Nongar Tolo Tolo Samay Yeh Holo Holo".

Death 
Gahar lost his memory following a brain stroke. He had an injury on his thigh and his back was injured from prolonged bed rest. As a result, he was admitted to Bangabandhu Sheikh Mujib Medical University Hospital in Dhaka and died there on 7 October  2015.

References 

People of the Bangladesh Liberation War
Bangladeshi lyricists
2015 deaths
1937 births
Recipients of the Independence Day Award
Mukti Bahini personnel